Allison Dabbs Garrett (born January 22, 1964) is an American attorney, inventor, educator, and the chancellor of the Oklahoma State System of Higher Education. She previously served as the 17th president of Emporia State University from January 2016 to October 2021, and prior to her time at Emporia State, Garrett served as Abilene Christian University's executive vice president, a position she held from August 20, 2012, to December 23, 2015. Garrett has held several vice president positions in both education and the private sector.

Biography

Education
Born and raised in Neosho, Missouri, Garrett graduated from Oklahoma Christian College as an English major in 1984, as well as the University of Tulsa's College of Law in 1987 with her Doctor of Jurisprudence. Her Master of Laws degree came from the Georgetown University's Law Center in 1992.

Career

Early and pre-education career
While attending Georgetown Law, Garrett worked at the U.S. Securities and Exchange Commission from 1988 to 1991 as a staff attorney. In 1994, Garrett moved to Bentonville, Arkansas to work for Walmart Stores, Inc., where she served as vice president and general counsel for the corporate division and as vice president of benefits compliance and planning. Garrett also holds a U.S. patent for a media disk holder, granted in 2003.

Education
After spending a decade with Walmart, Garrett moved to Montgomery, Alabama to serve as an assistant professor of law at Faulkner University's Thomas Goode Jones School of Law. Three years later in April 2007, Garrett was named Oklahoma Christian University's senior vice president for academic affairs in Oklahoma City, Oklahoma. While at Oklahoma Christian, Garrett oversaw the colleges, the school's library, the Honors program, and various other programs.

On August 20, 2012, Garrett began her three-and-a-half year term at Abilene Christian University. While at ACU, Garrett oversaw the financial operations, enrollment, and marketing, as well as the university's facilities. Garrett also worked with academics, advancement and athletics, as well as chairing several university committees. On October 22, 2015, Garrett was named Emporia State University's 17th president. She began her work as ESU's president in January 2016.

During her time at Emporia State, Garrett helped Emporia State achieve increased enrollment in the graduate school, set fundraising records for the university, and helped oversee projects including an aquatic research center, a new house for the university president, a new tennis complex, and a new residence hall. As ESU president, she served as vice chair of the NCAA Board of Governors and as chair of the NCAA Division II Presidents’ Council.

On September 24, 2021, she was named the first woman and ninth chancellor of the Oklahoma State System of Higher Education.  Garrett leads a state system comprising 25 state colleges and universities, 11 constituent agencies, one university center, and independent colleges and universities coordinated with the state system. She reports to a constitutional board whose nine members are appointed by the governor and confirmed by the Senate. Garrett directs 20 statewide scholarship programs, including the Oklahoma's Promise scholarship program, and statewide GEAR UP efforts. She was appointed by Gov. Kevin Stitt in November 2021 to serve a three-year term as an Oklahoma designee to the Southern Regional Education Board (SREB).

References

External links

Presidents of Emporia State University
Abilene Christian University faculty
Walmart people
Georgetown University Law Center alumni
University of Tulsa College of Law alumni
Oklahoma Christian University alumni
Educators from Kansas
1964 births
Living people
People from Neosho, Missouri
American women academics
21st-century American women
Women heads of universities and colleges